Peter James Plumb (born 26 November 1963) was chief executive officer from 2009-16 of Moneysupermarket.com Group plc, a company listed on the London Stock Exchange.

Between September 2017 and January 2019, he served as chief executive officer at Just Eat plc.

Early life

He attended Arnold Hill School in Arnold, Nottinghamshire, the first year in which it was a comprehensive school. He studied civil engineering at the University of Birmingham. He later studied at IMD in Switzerland.

Career
He became Chief Executive of Moneysupermarket in early 2009.

References

Living people
1963 births
Alumni of the University of Birmingham
British technology chief executives
People from Arnold, Nottinghamshire